Dimethylaminopivalophenone is an opioid analgesic with a potency ½ that of morphine. It was initially discovered by Russian scientists in 1954 and subsequently rediscovered in the US in 1969. Its LD50 in mice is 83 mg/kg. It has never been marketed commercially.

See also 
 Tapentadol
 List of opioids
 Opioid#Table of non-morphinan opioids

References 

Mu-opioid receptor agonists
Aromatic ketones
Dimethylamino compounds